A middle judicatory is an administrative structure or organization found in religious denominations between the local congregation and the widest or highest national or international level. The term is meant to be neutral with regard to polity, though it derives from Presbyterianism where the local, regional and national bodies are themselves respectively higher courts.

Depending on the polity, the middle judicatory can have decisive authority over a local church, can offer standing for clergy members but little or no control over congregations, can offer counsel and services but no authority, or can serve as an informal vehicle for fellowship and communication.

Church of England
 Dioceses of the Church of England

Church of Scotland
 Synods and Presbyteries of the Church of Scotland

Episcopal Church in the United States of America
 Dioceses of the Episcopal Church in the United States of America
 Provinces of the Episcopal Church in the United States of America

Evangelical Lutheran Church in America
 Regions and Synods of the Evangelical Lutheran Church in America

Lutheran Church—Missouri Synod
 Districts of the Lutheran Church–Missouri Synod

Presbyterian Church (USA)
 List of Presbyterian Church (USA) synods and presbyteries

Religious Society of Friends (Quakers)
 Yearly Meetings

United Church of Canada
 Conferences and Presbyteries of the United Church of Canada

United Church of Christ
 Associations of the United Church of Christ
 Conferences of the United Church of Christ

United Methodist Church
 Conferences of the United Methodist Church

Unitarian Universalist Association
 Districts of the Unitarian Universalist Association

References

 Lummis, Adair T. The Middle Judicatory as a System of Congregations Connected to the Regional Office Hartford Institute for Religious Research  Accessed 20 July 2006.

Types of Christian organization